Elections to Salford Borough Council were held on 4 May 2000. One third of the council was up for election. The Labour Party kept overall control of the council. Overall turnout was 21.04%.

After the election, the composition of the council was:
Labour 52
Liberal Democrat 5
Conservative 3

Election result

|}

Ward results

References

2000
2000 English local elections
2000s in Greater Manchester